A special election was held in  in 1814 to fill a vacancy left by the resignation of Henry Clay (DR) on January 19, 1814 to accept a diplomatic position to the United Kingdom.

Election results

Hawkins took his seat March 29, 1814, during the 2nd (of 3) Session of the 13th Congress.  Hawkins did not run for re-election in the 14th Congress and was succeeded by Henry Clay again.

See also
List of special elections to the United States House of Representatives

References

2nd congressional district special election
Kentucky 02
1814 02
Kentucky 1814 02
Kentucky 1814 02
United States House of Representatives 1814 02